Events from the year 1729 in Denmark.

Incumbents
 Monarch – Frederick IV
 Grand Chancellor – Ulrik Adolf Holstein

Events

Births
 1 July – Jørgen Wichfeld, landowner (died 1797)

Deaths
 8 June – Prince Charles of Denmark (born 1680)

References

 
1720s in Denmark
Denmark
Years of the 18th century in Denmark